Liu Yulin is a Chinese film director, a graduate with the Master of Fine Arts degree from the Graduate Film program of the Tisch School of the Arts at New York University. In 2014, her short narrative film Door God, which is about a girl in China awaiting the return of her mother, won her the first international film prize - silver medal under the narrative category at the 41st Student Academy Awards. The same film later won in the category of Best Woman Student Filmmaker at the 20th Annual Directors Guild of America Student Film Awards - East Region. With her NYU thesis film Someone to Talk To, which is adapted from her father Liu Zhenyun's award-winning novel One Sentence Is Ten Thousand Sentences, she made her feature film debut in October 2016 at the New Currents section at the 21st Busan International Film Festival.

Filmography

Accolades

References

Living people
Film directors from Beijing
Tisch School of the Arts alumni
Communication University of China alumni
1987 births